Zhaoqing East railway station is a railway station in Yong'an, Dinghu District, Zhaoqing, Guangdong, China. It is an intermediate station on the Guiyang–Guangzhou high-speed railway. It opened on 26 January 2015. The station has four island platforms and one side platform. It is situated adjacent and perpendicular to Dinghu East railway station and a walkway is provided for transfer between the two stations.

References 

Railway stations in Guangdong
Railway stations in China opened in 2015